Blackfella Films is a Sydney-based documentary and narrative production company, founded in 1992 by Rachel Perkins. The company produces distinctive Australian short and feature-length content for film and television with a particular focus on Aboriginal Australian stories. Its productions have included the documentary series First Australians, the documentary The Tall Man, the television film Mabo, and the TV series Redfern Now.

History
Blackfella Films was founded in 1992 by Arrernte writer, producer, and director Rachel Perkins. Producer Darren Dale joined the company in 2002, while former Head of Drama at the ABC, Miranda Dear, joined in 2010 with a focus on producing the company's dramatic content.

The company's most successful production has been the multi-award-winning seven-part 2008 documentary series First Australians. This series experienced both national and international success, including screening to over 2.3 million viewers in Australia on SBS, and has since become the best selling educational DVD in Australia.

The 2011 documentary, The Tall Man, won the inaugural Walkley Award for "Long-form Journalism: Documentary". In 2012 they released the docudrama Mabo, a telemovie, and produced the six-part television drama series Redfern Now. In late 2012 a second series of Redfern Now was awarded funding from Screen Australia, and went into production in May 2013.

From 2002 to 2011 Blackfella Films curated the Message Sticks Indigenous Film Festival, showcasing indigenous cinema from around the world. The festival was held at the Sydney Opera House before touring the country.

In October 2021 the series Addicted Australia, by Jacob Hickey and Darren Dale of Blackfella Films and SBS Television, was one of three documentaries shortlisted for the Walkley Documentary Award.

Selected filmography
 From Sand to Celluloid – Payback (1996) (short film) 
 Flat (2002) (short film)
 Mimi (2002) (short film)
 First Australians (2008) (documentary series)
 The Party Shoes (2009) (short film) 
 Jacob (2009) (short film) 
 Lani's Story (2010) (documentary) 
 The Tall Man (2011) (documentary)
 Mabo (2012) (TV docudrama film)
 Redfern Now (2012–2013) (TV series)
 First Contact (2014) (documentary series)
 DNA Nation (2016) (3-part documentary series)
 Total Control (2019, 2021) (TV series)

References

External links
 Blackfella Films Official Website
 
 Facebook

Aboriginal cinema in Australia
Film production companies of Australia
Television production companies of Australia
Companies based in Sydney
Entertainment companies established in 1992
Mass media companies established in 1992
Indigenous Australian mass media
Australian companies established in 1992